The following is a chronological list of compositions by Libby Larsen, divided into genre groups.

List of works

Opera
 Some Pig (1973)
 Children's opera in one act
 Moon Drop (1976 & 1980)
full evening performance with water slides, tapes, and costumes
 The Silver Fox (1979)
 Family opera in one act; John Olive, libretto
 Clair de Lune (1984)
two-act chamber opera; libretto by Patricia Hampl
 Frankenstein: The Modern Prometheus (1990)
full-length music drama; libretto by Libby Larsen
 A Wrinkle in Time (1991)
one-act opera; libretto by Walter Green
 Mrs. Dalloway (1993)
full-length music drama in two acts; libretto by Bonnie Grice
 Eric Hermannson's Soul (1998)
full-length opera with orchestra; libretty by Chas Rader-Shieber
 Barnum's Bird (2000)
chamber choral opera in two acts; libretto by Bridget Carpenter
 Dreaming Blue (2002)
opera in one act for child actor, SATB soloists, children's chorus, rhythm chorus, and drumming group; libretto by Libby Larsen
 Every Man Jack (2006)
chamber opera, based on the life of Jack London; libretto by Philip Littell
 Picnic (2009)
opera in three acts based on the play by William Inge; libretto by David Holley

Orchestral
 Weaver's Song & Jig (1978)
chamber orchestra and string band
 Pinions (1981)
violin concerto with chamber orchestra
 Deep Summer Music (1982)
full orchestra
 Overture: Parachute Dancing (1983)
full orchestra
 Symphony: Water Music (Symphony No. 1) (1985)
full orchestra
 Coming Forth Into day (Symphony No. 2) (1986)
soprano solo, baritone solo, SATB chorus, full orchestra; various texts
 What the Monster Saw (1987)
full orchestra, optional slides, adapted from the opera Frankenstein.
 Collage: Boogie (1988)
full orchestra
 Concerto for Trumpet and Orchestra (1988)
C trumpet and full orchestra
 Concerto: Cold, Silent Snow (1989)
flute, harp, chamber orchestra
 Tambourines! (1991)
full orchestra
 The Atmosphere as a Fluid System (1992)
solo flute, percussion, string orchestra
 Marimba Concerto: After Hampton (1992)
solo marimba, full orchestra
 Piano Concerto: Since Armstrong (1992)
solo piano, full orchestra
 Symphony No. 3: Lyric (1992)
full orchestra
 Overture for the End of a Century (1994)
full orchestra
 Song-Dances to the Light (1994)
 SA chorus, Orff instruments, full orchestra (or piano); text by young people
 Ring of Fire (1995)
full orchestra
 Blue Fiddler (1996)
full orchestra
 Fanfare: Strum (1996)
orchestra, no strings
 Roll Out the Thunder (1997)
full orchestra
 Spell On Me That Holy Hour: Overture to Tsvetaeva (1997)
full orchestra
 All Around Sound (1999)
full orchestra, cued CD; text by John Coy
 Solo Symphony (Symphony No. 5) (1999)
full orchestra
 String Symphony (Symphony No. 4) (1999)
string orchestra
 Still Life With Violin (2000)
solo violin and full orchestra
 Fanfare: Sizzle (2001)
full orchestra
 Brandenburg for the New Millennium (2002)
trumpet, marimba, electric guitar, amplified harpsichord, and string orchestra
 Song Concerto (2005)
saxophone (alto and soprano) and chamber orchestra
 Bach 358 (2008)
full orchestra
 Evening in the Palace of Reason (2008)
string orchestra, solo string quartet
 Encircling Skies (2009)
double choir, full orchestra, full wind ensemble, three marimbas, three pianos
 Sacred Vows (2009)
tenor, baritone, narrator, SATB chorus, full orchestra; text by U Sam Oeur
 The Moabit Sonnets (2011)
two sopranos, tenor, bass, chamber orchestra; text by Albrecht Haushofer, trans. M.D. Herter Norton

Band
 Grand Rondo (1988)
concert band
 Sun Song (1991)
concert band
 Brass Flight (1996)
brass choir
 Concert Dances (1996)
concert band
 Short Symphony (1996)
concert band
 Hambone (1999)
concert band
 Strut (2003)
concert band
 River Fanfare (2004)
British brass band
 An Introduction to the Moon (2005)
symphonic wind ensemble, tuned water glasses, recorded voice, eight collaborative improvisations
 Cri de Coeur (2009)
solo euphonium and wind ensemble

Instrumental
 Circular Rondo, Canti Breve (1974)
oboe and guitar
 Three Pieces for Treble Wind and Guitar (1974)
treble winds and guitar
 Piano Suite (1976)
solo piano
 Impromptu (1998)
flute, clarinet, and bassoon
 Corker (1979)
clarinet and percussion
 Jazz Variations for Solo Bassoon (1977)
solo bassoon
 Tango (1978)
solo guitar
 Bronze Veils (1979)
trombone, two percussion
 Saraband: In profane style (1979)
solo guitar
 Cajun Set (1980)
guitar and string trio
 Scudding (1980)
solo cello
 Black Roller (1981)
flute, oboe, clarinet, bassoon, piano, violin, viola (featured), and cello
 Aubade (1982)
solo flute
 Four on the Floor (1983)
violin, cello, contrabass, piano
 Sonata In One Movement on Kalenda Maya (1983)
solo organ
 Up Where the Air Gets Thin (1985)
cello and contrabass
 With Love & Hisses (1985)
double woodwind quintet.
Accompanies the silent Laurel and Hardy film "Love and Hisses."
 Juba (1986)
cello and piano
 Song Without Words (1986)
clarinet and piano
 Astonishing Flight of the Gump (1987)
flute, oboe, bassoon, and piano
 Black Birds, Red Hills (1987)
clarinet, viola, and piano
 Fantasy on Slane
organ and flute
 Kathleen, as she was (1989)
oboe and harpsichord
 Aspects of Glory (1990)
solo organ
 Xibalba (1990)
bassoon and percussion
 Schoenberg, Schenker, and Schillinger (1991)
flute, oboe, viola, cello, and keyboard
 String Quartet Schoenberg, Schenker, and Schillinger (1991)
string quartet
 Dancing Solo (1994)
solo clarinet
 Fanfare for the Women (1994)
solo trumpet
 Slang (1994)
clarinet, violin, and piano
 Concert Piece for Tuba & Piano (1995)
tuba and piano
 Blessed be the Tie That Binds (1996)
solo organ
 Blue Third Pieces (1996)
flute or clarinet and guitar
 Brass Flight (1996)
brass choir
 Holy Roller (1997)
saxophone and piano
 Prelude on Veni Creator Spiritus (1997)
solo organ
 Brazen Overture (2000)
brass quintet
 Mephisto Rag (2000)
solo piano
 Neon Angel (2000)
violin, cello, clarinet (or saxophone), flute, piano, percussion, and cued CD
 Three for the Road (2000)
violin, cello, and piano
 The Atmosphere as a Fluid System (also known as "Sky Concerto) (2001)
flute and orchestra
 Barn Dances (2001)
flute, clarinet, and piano
 Trio for Violin, Cello, and Piano (2001)
violin, cello, and piano
 Viola Sonata (2001)
viola and piano
 Licorice Stick (2002)
clarinet and piano
 On a Day of Bells (2002)
solo organ
 Argyle Sketches (2003)
solo guitar
 Bid Call (2003)
alto saxophone, cello
 Fanfare for Humanity (2003)
brass ensemble
 Firebrand (2003)
flute/piccolo, violin, cello, and piano
 Pocket Sonata (2003)
oboe, alto saxophone, violin, cello, marimba/vibraphone, and piano
 Bee Navigation (2004)
solo clarinet
 Concertino for Tenor Steel Drum and Chamber Ensemble (2004)
tenor steel drum and chamber ensemble
 For Two (2004)
four-hand piano
 Gavel Patter (2004)
four-hand piano
 Pealing Fire (2004)
carillon
 Penta Metrics (2004)
solo piano
 Wait a Minute (2004)
saxophone quartet
 Yellow Jersey (2004)
Bb clarinet duet
 Blue Windows: After Marc Chagall (2005)
woodwind quintet and piano
 Fanfare for a Learned man (2005)
brass quintet
 Now I Pull Silver (2005)
amplified flute and prepared CD; text by A. E. Stallings
 Slow Structures (2005)
flute, cello, and piano
 Song Concerto (2005)
saxophone and chamber orchestra
 Trio in Four Movements (2005)
four movements
flute, violin, and harp
 Concert Piece for Bassoon and Piano (2006)
bassoon and piano
 Engelberg: Trio for Brass and Organ (2006)
trumpet, horn in F, trombone, and organ
 He Arose: A Fanfare for Easter (2006)
organ, two trumpet, two trombone, optional horn
 The Adventures of Wonderboy: Issue One (2008)
bass, sampler, narrator, cartoons, strings
 Double String Quartet, J.S.B. (2008)
double string quartet
 Quartet: She Wrote (2008)
string quartet
Ricochet (2008)
two marimbas
 Ricochet (piano) (2008)
solo piano
 Downwind of Roses in Maine (2009)
flute, Bb clarinet, and mallet percussion
 Over, Easy (2009)
violin, viola, cello, and piano
 In Such a Night (2010)
two violas and recorded voice; text by William Shakespeare
 Like Blind Men Tapping in the Dark (2010)
one marimba, two performers
 Rodeo Queen of Heaven (2010)
clarinet, violin, cello, and piano
 Ursa (2010)
tuba and wind ensemble
 4 ½: A Piano Suite (2016)
solo piano

Choral
 Eine Kleine Snailmusik (1978)
SA and contrabass; text by May Sarton
 All Shall Be Well (1979)
SA, soprano solo, soprano recorder, triangle, and keyboard; text by Libby Larsen
 Dance Set (1980)
SATB, clarinet, cello, percussion, piano; textless
 Double Joy (1982)
SATB divisi, handbells, organ; text by Michael Thwaites
 In a Winter Garden (1982)
SATB, soprano and tenor solos, chamber orchestra; text by Patricia Hempl
 Everyone Sang (1983)
SATB, harp, two percussion; text by Siegfried Sassoon
 Ringeltanze (1983)
five movements
SATB, handbells, string orchestra; medieval French text
 A Creeley Collection (1984)
five movements
SATB, flute, percussion, piano; text by Robert Creeley
 Welcome Yule (1984)
TTBB and strings
 Clair de Lune (1985)
TTBB, tenor solo; text by Paul Verlaine
 I Love the Lord (1985)
SATB and organ; text by Nathan Everett
 Peace, Perfect Peace (1985)
SATB a cappella; text from Isaiah 26:3, Edward Bickersteth
 We Celebrate (1985)
SATB, piano or organ; text by John Cummins
 Who Cannot Weep, Come Learn of Me (1985)
SSA, mezzo-soprano and tenor solos; text from MS09.38 Trinity College
 Clair de Lune in Blue (1986)
SATB jazz choir, piano; textless
 Songs of Youth and Pleasure (1986)
four movements
SATB a cappella; Renaissance text
 Canticle of the Sun (1987)
SSAAA, finger cymbals, synthesizer, organ; text by St. Francis of Assisi
 A Garden Wall (1987)
unison choir, keyboard, Orff instruments, 7 speaking roles, and congregation
 Refuge (1988)
SSAA a cappella; text by Sara Teasdale
 The Settling Years (1988)
three movements
SATB, woodwind quintet, piano, percussion; 20th century biographical texts
 Three Summer Scenes (1988)
SATB, optional youth choirs, full orchestra; texts by William Carlos Williams, Lloyd Frankenburg, and Maurice Lindsay
 How it Thrills Us (1990)
SATB a cappella; text by Rainer Marie Rilke
 I Am a Little Church (1991)
SATB and organ; text by e.e. cummings
 Alleluia (1992)
SATB a cappella
 Deck the Halls (1992)
TTBB, five soloists, piano, handbells
 Eagle Poem (1992)
SATB, four-hand piano; text by Joy Harjo
 Missa Gaia—Mass for the Earth (1992)
SATB, SSA, soprano solo, oboe, strings, four-hand piano
 Mother, Sister, Blessed Holy (1992)
SATB, four-hand piano
 Pied Beauty (Glory to God) (1992)
SATB, four-hand piano; text by Gerard Manley Hopkins
 God As Ribbon of Light (1993)
SATB and organ; text by Sr. Mary Virginia Micka
 Canticle of Mary (1994)
SSA, four-hand piano or chamber orchestra; text from the Magnificat and Gregorian hymnal
 A Choral Welcome (1994)
SATB divisi, keyboard or orchestra; text by G. Galina
 I Just Lightning (1994)
SSAA and percussion; text by María Sabina
 Little Notes on A Simple Staff (1994)
SATB and piano; text by Siv Cedering
 Fanfare & Alleluia (1995)
SATB, brass, handbells, chimes, and organ
 I Arise Today (1995)
SATB and organ; text from St Patrick's Breastplate
 I Will Sing and Raise a Psalm (1995)
SATB and organ; text by St. Francis of Assisi
 Invitation to Music (1995)
SATB and string quartet, string orchestra, or piano; text by Elizabeth Bishop
 Seven Ghosts (1995)
five movements
SATB with soprano solo, brass quintet, piano, and percussion; 20th century biographical texts
 Today, This Spring (1995)
three songs
SA and piano; text by Emily Dickinson, Charles Wilson, and Jan Kimes
 Eleanor Roosevelt (1996)
SATB with soprano and mezzo-soprano solos, speaker, clarinet, cello, piano and percussion; text by Sally M. Gall
 So Blessedly It Sprung (1996)
SATB, oboe, viola, and harp; text from 12th century poetry by Adam of Saint Victor
 I Find My Feet Have Further Goals (1997)
SATB a cappella; text by Emily Dickinson
 Love Songs (1997)
SATB and piano; text based on love songs by American woman poets
 May Sky (1997)
SATB divisi, a cappella; text by Tokuji Hirai, Neiji Ozawa, Reiko Gomyo, and Suiko Matsushita
 Reasons for Loving Harmonica (1997)
SATB and piano; text by Julie Kane
 Density of Light (1998)
SATB, treble choir, brass; text by Thomas H. Troeger
 Ring the Bells (1998)
SSA children's chorus and piano; text by M.K. Dean
 Stepping Westward (1998)
SSA, handbells, oboe, and marimba; text by Denise Levertov
 Sweet & Sour Nursery Rhymes (1998)
SATB and french horn; text by Eugene Field and traditional
 By a Departing Light (1999)
SATB a cappella, text by Emily Dickinson
 Day Song (1999)
SSA a cappella; text by N. F. S. Grundtvig, and Libby Larsen
 Is God, Our Endless Day (1999)
SATB a cappella; text by Julian of Norwich
 A Salute to Louis Armstrong (1999)
from choral suite Seven Ghosts.
SATB divisi and piano; text by Louis Armstrong
 To a Long Loved Love (1999)
SATB, string quartet; text by Madeleine L'Engle
 Four Valentines: A Lover's Journey (2000)
four movements
six-voice male a cappella; text by James Joyce, William Shakespeare, and Karl Joseph Simrock
 Falling (2000)
SATB chorus, SATB quartet, SAT trio, trumpet, piano, and percussion; text by James Dickey
 How To Songs (2000)
SSA (children's) chorus
 Lord, Before This Fleeting Season (2000)
SATB a cappella; text by Maryann Jindra
 Psalm 121 (2000)
SSAA divisi a cappella; text from and by Psalm 121, Patricia Hennings, and John Muir
 Touch the Air Softly (2000)
SSAA a cappella; text by William Jay Smith
 The Witches Trio (2001)
SSAA a cappella; text by William Shakespeare
 If I Can Stop One Heart From Breaking (2001)
SSA, woodwind quintet, percussion, and strings; text by Emily Dickinson
 Jack's Valentine (2001)
SSAA; text by Aldeen Humphreys
 The Ballerina and the Clown (2002)
SSA and harp; text by Sally Gall
 Flee We to Our Lord (2002)
SATB a cappella; text by Julian of Norwich
 Come Before Winter (2003)
SATB, baritone solo, orchestra or piano; text by Arthur Mampel
 I It Am: The Shewings of Julian of Norwich (2003)
SATB divisi, soprano, countertenor, baritone, and chamber orchestra; text by Julian of Norwich
 Womanly Song of God (2003)
SSAA divisi a cappella; text by Catherine de Vinck
 A Young Nun Singing (2003)
SSA a cappella; text by anonymous, Juana Inés de la Cruz, and Idea Vilarino
 Cry Peace (2004)
SATB divisi a cappella; text adapted by Libby Larsen
 Jesus, Jesus, Rest Your Head (2004)
two or three-part, solo voice, and piano; traditional text
 Natus Est Emmanuel (2004)
SSAA divisi a cappella; anonymous text from Piae Cantiones
 Praise One (2004)
SATB, SATB favori, orchestra; text adapted by Libby Larsen from Psalms 146, 147, 148, and 150
 The Shepherds and the Angels (2004)
SATB, soprano and baritone solos, organ and brass ensemble; text from Luke 2:8-20
 Giving Thanks (2005)
SSAA and string quartet; text by Chief Jake Swamp
 God So Loved the World (2005)
SATB a cappella; text from John 3:16-17
 I Dream of Peace (2005)
SATB and percussion; text by children of former Yugoslavia
 The Nothing That Is (2005)
SATB, baritone solo, three speaking voices and chamber ensemble; text adapted by Libby Larsen
 The Summer Day (2005)
SSAA and string quartet; text by Mary Oliver
 Western Songs (2005)
SATB a cappella; text from American Folksongs
 Of Music (2006)
SSAA and four-hand piano; text by Emily Dickinson
 The Blackbird (2007)
TTBB and piano; text by Wallace Stevens
 Crowding North (2007)
three pieces
SATB, guitar, flute, oboe, bassoon, and string quartet
 Four Meditations of Mechthild of Magdeburg (2007)
SATB, organ, handbells; text by Mechthild of Magdeburg
 I Lift My Eyes to the Hills (2007)
SATB, handbells, organ; text from Psalm 121
 Novum Gaudium (2007)
SATB a cappella; text from and by Ecce Novum Gaudium and Angelus Emittitur
 A Simple Gloria (2007)
SATB a cappella; text by M. K. Dean
 Whitman's America (2007)
SATB a cappella; text by Walt Whitman
 To Sing (2008)
SSA and piano; text by Kasey Zitnik
 A Book of Spells (2009)
SSAA and piano; text by Z. E. Budapest
 Free, Fearless, and Female (2009)
SSAA and marimba; text by Judy Belski, Anonymous Pampa Poem trans. by W. S. Merwin, and Anna Swir
 Celebration Mass-Lutheran Edition (2010)
SATB choir, congregation, organ, and optional handbells, brass quintet/quartet and percussion/timpani; text from traditional Lutheran liturgy
 Chain of Hope (2010)
SATB, baritone, actress, piano; text from various letters and writings regarding Frederick Douglass; libretto by Libby Larsen, Kathleen Holt and Jeanne Soderberg
 Concord Fragments (2010)
SSAA, oboe, clarinet and piano; text adapted by Libby Larsen
 Arctic Spring (2011)
SATB chorus and string quartet or piano; text by Tom Sexton
 Celebration Mass-Catholic Edition (2011)
SATB choir, congregation, organ; text from traditional Catholic liturgy
 If Music Be the Food of Love (2011)
SATB; text by Henry Heveningham
 Matineé: The Fantom of the Fair (2014)
 soprano, baritone, violin, cello, piano with animated slideshow by Toni Lindgren based on Paul Gustavson's 1939 comic book of the same name - première April 6, 2014, Rivers School Conservatory, Weston, Massachusetts

Voice
 Saints Without Tears (1976)
soprano, flute, and bassoon; text by Phyllis McGinley
 Selected Poems of Rainer Maria Rilke (1978)
soprano, flute, guitar, and harp; text by Rainer Maria Rilke
 Cowboy Songs (1979)
soprano and piano; text by Anonymous, Belle Starr, and Robert Creeley
 Three Rilke Songs (1980)
high voice and guitar; text by Rainer Maria Rilke
 A Verse Record of my Peonies (1980)
tenor, tape, and percussion; text by Masaoka Shiki
 Before Winter (1982)
baritone and organ; text by Arthur Mampel
 Me (Brenda Ueland) (1987)
soprano and piano; text by Brenda Ueland
 Songs From Letters (1989)
soprano and piano or chamber ensemble; text by Calamity Jane
 When I Am An Old Woman (1990)
soprano and piano; text by Jenny Joseph
 Sonnets From the Portuguese (1991)
soprano and chamber ensemble or piano; text by Elizabeth Barrett Browning
 How Lovely Are Thy Holy Groves (1992)
soprano and piano; text from the Chinook Psalter
 Perineo (1993)
baritone and piano; text by Roberto Echavarren
 Beloved, Thou Hast Brought Me Many Flowers (1994)
mezzo-soprano, cello, and piano; text by Elizabeth Barrett Browning, Hilde Doolittle, Rainer Maria Rilke, and Percy Bysshe Shelley
 Mary Cassatt (1994)
mezzo-soprano, trombone, orchestra and slides; text from the historical narrative and letters of Mary Cassatt
 Margaret Songs (1996)
soprano and piano; text by Willa Cather and Libby Larsen
 Chanting to Paradise (1997)
soprano and piano; text by Dickinson
 Lord, Make Me An Instrument (1997)
tenor and piano; text by St. Francis of Assisi
 The Ant and the Grasshopper (1998)
soprano and piano; text by Jeanne Shepard
 Late in the Day (1998)
soprano and piano; text by Jeanne Shepard
 Songs of Light and Love (1998)
soprano and chamber ensemble; text by May Sarton
 Love After 1950 (2000)
five movements
mezzo-soprano and piano; text by Rita Dove, Julie Kane, Kathryn Daniels, Liz Lochhead, and Muriel Rukeyser
 My Antonia (2000)
high voice and piano; text by Willa Cather
 Try Me, Good King: Last Words of the Wives of Henry VIII (2000)
five movements
soprano and piano; text by Katherine of Aragon, Anne Boleyn, Jane Seymour, Anne of Cleves, Catherine Howard, and Catherine Parr
 Hell's Belles (2001)
four movements
mezzo-soprano and handbells; text by Tallulah Bankhead, Billie Jean King, Gertrude Stein, and Nursery Rhyme
 Jazz at the Intergalactic Nightclub (2001)
tenor and piano; text by Thomas McGrath
 Notes Shipped Under the Door (2001)
soprano, flute, and orchestra; text by Eugenia Zukerman
Raspberry Island Dreaming (2002)
mezzo-soprano and full orchestra; text by Joyce Stuphen and Patricia Hampl
 Raspberry Island Dreaming (Piano/Vocal) (2002)
mezzo-soprano and piano; text by Joyce Stuphen and Patricia Hampl
 De Toda la Eternidad (2003/2005)
soprano and wind ensemble or piano; text by Sor Juana Inez de la Cruz
 I Love You Through the Daytimes (2003)
baritone and piano; ancient Egyptian text
 This Unbearable Stillness: Songs from the Balcony (2003)
soprano and string quartet; text by Dima Hilal and Sekena Shaben
 Fern Hill (2004)
solo tenor; text by Dylan Thomas
 A Pig in the House (2004)
tenor and piano; Alvin Greenburg
 Sifting Through the Ruins (2005)
mezzo-soprano, viola, and piano; text by Hilary North, anonymous, Alicia Vasquez, Martha Cooper, and Ted Berrigan
 Take (2006)
soprano and piano; text by Margaret Atwood
 Center Field Girl (2007)
soprano and piano; text by Michele Antonello Frisch
 A Quiet Song (2007)
baritone and piano; text by Brenda Ueland
written in memory of Bruce Carlson of the Schubert Club
 Righty, 1966 (2007)
soprano, flute, and piano; text by Michele Antonello Frisch
 Within the Circles of Our Lives (2007)
soprano, baritone, and wind ensemble; text by Wendell Berry
 Far in a Western Brookland (2008)
tenor and piano; text by A. E. Housman
 Forget Me Not (2008)
soprano and tenor duet and piano; anonymous text from Cupples and Leon Given book of poems
 This Unbearable Stillness: Songs from the Balcony, Orchestral Version (2008)
soprano, percussion I, II, III, celeste, and string orchestra; text by Dima Hilal and Sekeena Shaben
 Song (2009)
solo soprano; text by e.e. cummings
 The Strange Case of Dr. H.H. Holmes (2010)
baritone and prepared piano; text by H. H. Holmes aka Herman Mudgett

References 
"Libby Larsen: Works", accessed 03/21/2011.

External links 
 Libby Larsen - Home

Lists of compositions by composer